Martellivirales is an order of viruses.

Taxonomy
The following families are recognized:
Bromoviridae
Closteroviridae
Endornaviridae
Kitaviridae
Mayoviridae
Togaviridae
Virgaviridae

References

Viruses